Simon Wainwright (born 13 August 1971) is a British swimmer. He competed in two events at the 1992 Summer Olympics.  He graduated from Harvard College.

References

External links
 

1971 births
Living people
British male swimmers
Olympic swimmers of Great Britain
Swimmers at the 1992 Summer Olympics
Sportspeople from Lincoln, England
Harvard Crimson men's swimmers